Allium macrum, the rock onion, is an American species of wild onion native to the eastern and central parts of the US States of Oregon and Washington. It grows on gravelly soils at elevations up to 1400 m. It is a perennial herb.

Allium macrum produces round to egg-shaped bulbs up to 2 cm long. Flowers are white with a green stripe running the length of each tepal. Anthers and pollen are yellow.

References

macrum
Flora of Washington (state)
Flora of Oregon
Endemic flora of the United States
Plants described in 1879
Taxa named by Sereno Watson
Flora without expected TNC conservation status